Andreae is a surname. The name may refer to:

Andreae & Co., a historical pharmacy in Hanover
Charles Andreae (1906–1970), English cricketer
Giles Andreae (born 1966), British poet, artist, and greeting card writer
Hieronymus Andreae (died 1556), German woodblock cutter, printer, publisher, and typographer 
Jakob Andreae (1528–1590), German Lutheran theologian, signatory of the 1577 Formula of Concord
Johann Gerhard Reinhard Andreae (1724–1793), German natural scientist and polymath
Johannes Valentinus Andreae (1586–1654), German theologian
Julian Voss-Andreae (born 1970), German sculptor living and working in the USA
Kerstin Andreae (born 1968), German politician and member of Alliance '90/The Greens in the Bundestag
Laurentius Andreae (1470–1552), Swedish clergyman and scholar, one of the main proponents of the Swedish Protestant reformation
Otto Stuart Andreae (1863–1930), British actor-manager as Otho Stuart
Percy Andreae (fl. early 20th century), American anti-prohibitionist
Volkmar Andreae (1879–1962), Swiss conductor and composer